The discography of Laura Marling, an English folk musician, consists of seven studio albums, one live album, six extended plays and seventeen singles. She has also featured on singles by two other artists and released an EP in collaboration with Mumford and Sons and Indian collective Dharohar Project in 2010.

Albums

Studio albums

Live albums

Extended plays

Singles

As lead artist

As featured artist

Promotional singles

References

External links

Discographies of British artists
Folk music discographies